Georg Riedel may refer to:

 Georg Riedel (Altstadt Kantor) (1676–1738) Kantor at the Altstadt church, Königsberg, who composed oratorios of Gospel of Matthew and Revelation
 Georg Riedel (jazz musician) (born 1934), composer of music for Astrid Lindgren movies
 Georg Riedel (glass manufacturer), Austrian wine glass manufacturer
 Georg Josef Riedel (born 1949), 10th-generation owner of Riedel